José López Prudencio (11 November 1870 – September 1949) was a writer from Badajoz.

1870 births
1949 deaths
People from Badajoz
Spanish male writers